Dabak may refer to:

Dabak Daba Aisa
Anand Dabak, American engineer
Asuman Dabak, Turkish actress